The 1986 Pan Pacific Open was a women's tennis tournament played on indoor carpet courts at the Tokyo Metropolitan Gymnasium in Tokyo in Japan and was part of the Category 4 tier of the 1986 WTA Tour. It was the 11th edition of the tournament and ran from 8 September through 14 September 1986. First-seeded Steffi Graf won the singles title.

Finals

Singles
 Steffi Graf defeated  Manuela Maleeva 6–4, 6–2
 It was Graf's 6th singles title of the year and of her career.

Doubles
 Bettina Bunge /  Steffi Graf defeated  Katerina Maleeva /  Manuela Maleeva 6–1, 6–7(4–7), 6–2

References

External links
 Official website 
 Official website 
 ITF tournament edition details
 Tournament draws

Pan Pacific Open
Pan Pacific Open
Pan Pacific Open
Pan Pacific Open
Pan Pacific Open